Olin Observatory  is an astronomical observatory in New London, Connecticut (USA), owned and operated by Connecticut College. It is part of the F.W. Olin Science Center. The observatory hosts public stargazing events, and is also used for undergraduate instruction.

Telescopes
 A  Ritchey–Chrétien reflecting telescope was built by Optomechanics and sits on a half-fork equatorial mount. 
 An 1881 Alvan Clark refracting telescope is located at the old observatory on top of Frederic Bill Hall.

See also 
 List of Astronomical Observatories

References

External links
 Observatories at Connecticut College
 Olin Observatory Clear Sky Clock Forecasts of observing conditions.

Astronomical observatories in Connecticut
Connecticut College
Buildings and structures in New London, Connecticut
Tourist attractions in New London, Connecticut